Lajuan Simon (born February 25, 1979) is an American professional boxer from Philadelphia, Pennsylvania that fights as a middleweight.

Simon has twice fought for major world boxing titles.  On March 13, 2009, he lost a unanimous decision to Arthur Abraham for the IBF middleweight title.  On December 9, 2011, he lost by a first round knockout to Gennady Golovkin for the WBA (regular) and the vacant IBO middleweight titles.

Simon also holds a victory over Elvin Ayala for the regional USBA championship.

Professional boxing record

References

External links
 

1979 births
African-American boxers
Boxers from Philadelphia
Living people
Middleweight boxers
American male boxers
21st-century African-American sportspeople
20th-century African-American sportspeople